Compound may refer to:

Architecture and built environments
 Compound (enclosure), a cluster of buildings having a shared purpose, usually inside a fence or wall
 Compound (fortification), a version of the above fortified with defensive structures
 Compound (migrant labour), a hostel for migrant workers such as those historically connected with mines in South Africa
 The Compound, an area of Palm Bay, Florida, US
 Komboni or compound, a type of slum in Zambia

Government and law
 Composition (fine), a legal procedure in use after the English Civil War
 Committee for Compounding with Delinquents, an English Civil War institution that allowed Parliament to compound the estates of Royalists
 Compounding treason, an offence under the common law of England
 Compounding a felony, a previous offense under the common law of England

Linguistics
 Compound (linguistics), a word that consists of more than one radical element
 Compound sentence (linguistics), a type of sentence made up of two or more independent clauses and no subordinate (dependent) clauses

Science, technology, and mathematics

Biology and medicine
 Compounding, the mixing of drugs in pharmacy
 Compound fracture, a complete fractures of bone where at least one fragment has damaged the skin, soft tissue or surrounding body cavity
 Compound leaf, a type of leaf being divided into smaller leaflets

Chemistry and materials science
 Chemical compound, combination of two or more elements
 Plastic compounding, a method of preparing plastic formulations

Vehicles and engines
 Compound engine, a steam engine in which steam is expanded through a series of two or three cylinders before exhaust
 Turbo-compound engine, an internal combustion engine where exhaust gases expand through power-turbines
 Compounding pressure, a method in which pressure in a steam turbine is made to drop in a number of stages

Other uses in science, technology, and mathematics
 Compound bow, a type of bow for archery
 Polyhedral compound, a polyhedron composed of multiple polyhedra sharing the same centre

Other uses

Common names
 Compound (music), an attribute of a time signature
 Compound interest, in finance, unpaid interest that is added to the principal
 Compound chocolate, an inexpensive chocolate substitute that uses cocoa but excludes cocoa butter

Proper names
 The Compound (book), a 2008 young adult novel by S. A. Bodeen
 Compound (company), a venture capital firm previously known as Metamorphic Ventures
 Eisenhuth Horseless Vehicle Company, or Compound, a former US automobile manufacturer

See also
 Composite (disambiguation)